Katete District with headquarters at Katete in Eastern Province, Zambia, includes woodland in the north sloping down into the Luangwa Valley, good farmland amid rocky hills in the centre, and deforested plateau exposed to soil erosion and degradation in the south along the border with Mozambique. As of the 2000 Zambian Census, the district had a population of 189,250 people. It consists of two constituencies, namely Mkaika and Milanzi.

References

Districts of Eastern Province, Zambia